Food drying is a method of food preservation in which food is dried (dehydrated or desiccated). Drying inhibits the growth of bacteria, yeasts, and mold through the removal of water. Dehydration has been used widely for this purpose since ancient times; the earliest known practice is 12,000 B.C. by inhabitants of the modern Middle East and Asia regions. Water is traditionally removed through evaporation by using methods such as air drying, sun drying, smoking or wind drying, although today electric food dehydrators or freeze-drying can be used to speed the drying process and ensure more consistent results.

Food types 

Many different foods can be prepared by dehydration. Meat has held a historically significant role. For centuries, much of the European diet depended on dried cod—known as salt cod, bacalhau (with salt), or stockfish (without). It formed the main protein source for the slaves on the West Indian plantations, and was a major economic force within the triangular trade. Dried fish most commonly cod or haddock, known as Harðfiskur, is a delicacy in Iceland, while dried reindeer meat is a traditional Sami food. Dried meats include prosciutto (Parma ham), bresaola, biltong and beef jerky.

Dried fruits have been consumed historically due to their high sugar content and sweet taste, and a longer shelf-life from drying. Fruits may be used differently when dried. The plum becomes a prune, the grape a raisin. Figs and dates may be transformed into different products that can either be eaten as they are, used in recipes, or rehydrated.

Freeze-dried vegetables are often found in food for backpackers, hunters, and the military. Garlic and onion are often dried. Edible mushrooms, as well as other fungi, are also sometimes dried for preservation purposes or to be used as seasonings.

Preparation 
Home drying of vegetables, fruit and meat can be carried out with electrical dehydrators (household appliance) or by sun-drying or by wind. Preservatives such as potassium metabisulfite, BHA, or BHT may be used, but are not required. However, dried products without these preservatives may require refrigeration or freezing to ensure safe storage for a long time.

Industrial food dehydration is often accomplished by freeze-drying. In this case food is flash frozen and put into a reduced-pressure system which causes the water to sublimate directly from the solid to the gaseous phase. Although freeze-drying is more expensive than traditional dehydration techniques, it also mitigates the change in flavor, texture, and nutritional value. In addition, another widely used industrial method of drying of food is convective hot air drying. Industrial hot air dryers are simple and easy to design, construct and maintain. More so, it is very affordable and has been reported to retain most of the nutritional properties of food if dried using appropriate drying conditions.

Another form of food dehydration is irradiation. Irradiation uses x-rays, ultraviolet light, and ionizing radiations to penetrate food to the point of sterilization. Astronauts and people who are highly at risk for microbial infections benefit from this method of food drying.

Hurdle technology is the combination of multiple food preservation methods. Hurdle technology uses low doses of multiple food preservation techniques in order to ensure food is not only safe but is desirable visually and texturally.

Packaging 
Packaging ensures effective food preservation. Some methods of packaging that are beneficial to dehydrated food are vacuum sealed, inert gases, or gases that help regulate respiration, biological organisms, and growth of microorganisms.

Other methods 

There are many different methods for drying, each with their own advantages for particular applications. These include:

 Convection drying
 Bed dryers
 Drum drying
 Freeze Drying
 Microwave-vacuum drying
 Shelf dryers
 Spray drying
 Infrared radiation drying
 Combined thermal hybrid drying
 Sunlight
 Commercial food dehydrators
 Household oven

See also 

 Bouillon cube
 Curing
 Dried fruit
 Instant noodles
 Instant soup
 List of dried foods
 List of smoked foods
 Meat extract

References

External links 

 National Center for Home Food Preservation, drying section

Cooking techniques
Drying processes
Food technology

Garde manger

ca:Assecatge